Nico United are an association football club based in Selebi-Phikwe, Botswana.

Their name of "Nico", which has been the target of jokes and Internet memes since Love Live! School Idol Project gained popularity, actually comes from the copper and nickel mining town of Selebi-Phikwe in the northeast part of Botswana, about 420 kilometres from the capital Gaborone.

History
The team were promoted to the Botswana Premier League for the first time in the 2004–05 season after spending the 2003–04 season playing in the First Division North.

Honours
FA Challenge Cup: 2
1986, 1987

Officials

Leslie Selema (Manager)
Masego Ntsatsi (Vice Manager)
Tlhalefang Bagwasi (Secretary)
Mokgosi (Vice Secretary)
Kgakgamatso Moreri (Treasurer)
Lopang Pule (PR Official)
Simeone Mooketsi (Add Member)
Shane Koontse (Supporters Chairman)
Mbiganyi Thatitswe
Comfort Buti
Vincent Mokgwathi

Football clubs in Botswana
Football clubs in Selebi-Phikwe